Pa Qaleh Rural District is a rural district (dehestan) in the Central District of Shahr-e Babak County, Kerman Province, Iran. At the 2006 census, its population was 1,261, in 371 families. The rural district has 18 villages.

References 

Rural Districts of Kerman Province
Shahr-e Babak County